The 2015 Tipperary Senior Football Championship was the main club football championship that took place in County Tipperary. Loughmore-Castleiney were the defending champions after winning their 13th title in 2014, but lost in the quarter-finals to Clonmel Commercials.	
	

Clonmel Commercials won their 16th title after a 1-12 to 3-5 win against Moyle Rovers in the final.

Fixtures
Preliminary Quarter-Finals 
 Loughmore-Castleiney 1-12 Kilsheelan Kilcash 1-8
 Aherlow Gaels 3-14 Thomas MacDonaghs 3-4
 Galtee Rovers 1-11 Cahir 2-6
 Killenaule received Bye

Quarter-Finals 	
 Arravale Rovers 0-17 Killenaule 0-9
 Moyle Rovers 4-15 Galtee Rovers 0-3
 Clonmel Commercials 2-12 Loughmore-Castleiney 1-7 
 Aherlow Gaels 0-15 Eire Og Annacarty 0-8

Semi-Finals 	
 Clonmel Commercials 0-9 Aherlow Gaels 0-5
 Moyle Rovers 2-15 Arravale Rovers 1-14

Final

References

External links
Tipperary GAA Official Site

Tipperary Senior Football Championship
Tipperary Senior Football Championship